Sydney Parr is an American softball player. She attended North Little Rock High School in North Little Rock, Arkansas. She later attended the University of Arkansas, where she played outfield for the Arkansas Razorbacks softball team.

Personal life
Parr is married to former University of Arkansas baseball player Evan Lee. The two met in college when they were both student athletes at the University of Arkansas.

References

External links
 
Arkansas bio

American softball players
Arkansas Razorbacks softball players
Living people
People from North Little Rock, Arkansas
Year of birth missing (living people)